Nidorella nordenstamii is a species of flowering plant in the family Asteraceae. It is found only in Namibia.

References

nordenstamii
Flora of Namibia
Least concern plants
Taxonomy articles created by Polbot
Plants described in 1969